Colun or Colún may refer to:

Cooperativa Agrícola y Lechera de La Unión Limitada (COLUN or Colún), a Chilean dairy cooperative company
Colún Beach, in Chile
Colún River, in Chile
Colun, a village in Porumbacu de Jos Commune, Sibiu County, Romania